George Cahill may refer to:

 George F. Cahill (1869–1935), American inventor
 George F. Cahill Jr. (1927–2012), American scientist